Monroe Township, population 52,310, is one of nine townships in Union County, North Carolina. This township contains the towns of Wingate (west parts of), Unionville, Mineral Springs, Wesley Chapel, Indian Trail, and the City of Monroe within its borders.

Geography
Most of the township is drained by Richardson Creek and its tributaries; Mill Creek, Meadow Branch, Stewarts Creek, Rays Fork, Bearskin Creek, Beaverdam Creek, and Little Richardson Creek.  The very western part of the township is drained by Twelvemile Creek and its tributaries.

References

Townships in Union County, North Carolina
Townships in North Carolina